Friedrich Wilhelm Hensing (17 April 1719 – 9 November 1745), born in Giessen, was a German professor of medicine and anatomy at the University of Giessen.

The phrenicocolic ligament is called Hensing's ligament after him.

Life
Hensing was a son of John Thomas Hensing, and his wife is Maria Juliana, the daughter of Friedrich Nitsch, the Hessian Court Assessors at the Law Faculty and Vice-Chancellor of University of Giessen.

Publications
 Dissertatio Inauguralis De Peritonaeo. Lammers, 1742.
 Denkmahl der Liebe. Hammer, 1744, 4 Seiten

References

1719 births
1745 deaths
University of Giessen alumni
People from Giessen